Market Street, originally known as High Street, is a major east–west highway and street in Philadelphia. The street is signed as Pennsylvania Route 3 between 38th Street (U.S. Route 13) and 15th Street (PA 611). A short portion of the road continues west from Cobbs Creek Parkway (63rd Street) to Delaware County, adjacent to Philadelphia.

High Street was the familiar name of the principal street in nearly every English town at the time Philadelphia was founded. But if Philadelphia was indebted to England for the name of High Street, nearly every American town is, in turn, indebted to Philadelphia for its Market Street. The city's first market stalls were situated in the center of the thoroughfare starting at Front Street and proceeding west eventually to 8th Street. The stalls soon became covered and were not taken down as planned. Later, additional covered sheds appeared west of Center Square as the city expanded westward. The street began to be called Market Street around 1800. The road's new name was made official by an ordinance in 1858, coincidentally just a year before the market sheds were ordered removed.

Market Street has been called the most historic highway in the United States because of the various historic sites along its eastern section. Many of Benjamin Franklin's activities were centered along Market Street. His house was located near the intersection of Fourth Street, and he may have performed his famous kite-flying experiment near Third and Market Streets. Thomas Jefferson wrote the Declaration of Independence in a boarding house, known as the Graff or Declaration House, once located at Seventh and Market Streets. The mansion of Robert Morris, financier of the American Revolution, was located near Sixth and Market Streets. This house, known as the President's House, was used by George Washington and John Adams as their residence during their terms as president. The house was located on the site of the northern part of the present-day Liberty Bell Center. Around 1795, Theophilus Cazenove lived on Market Street. Several important finance and publishing firsts also occurred along Market Street between Second and Fourth Streets during the 18th century. Market Street is still one of the principal locations of business and commerce in Philadelphia.

On June 5, 2013, a building collapsed at 22nd Street, trapping a number of people under the rubble. Six people died and fourteen others were injured.  The location of the accident has been dedicated as a memorial for the victims.

Route

Market Street runs from Millbourne to Front Street in Center City, Philadelphia.  At Front Street, a bridge over Interstate 95 brings traffic from Penn's Landing, on the western bank of the Delaware River, onto westbound Market Street.  Market Street runs one way, eastbound, between 20th Street and 15th Street, with westbound traffic diverted onto JFK Boulevard.

Market Street is interrupted between 15th Street and Juniper Street by Philadelphia City Hall, and so technically does not intersect with Broad Street. A pedestrian-only path continues Market Street across the City Hall block. Between 12th Street and roughly 20th Street, Market Street is heavily commercial, with office skyscrapers rising on both sides. In the past, there was once a connection to Market Street in Camden, New Jersey by ferry.

The street continues westward, crossing over the Schuylkill River via the Market Street Bridge, into and through University City and West Philadelphia. SEPTA's Market–Frankford Line runs along Market Street, as a subway east of 44th Street and as an elevated line above Market Street, west of there.

Landmarks

The most famous landmark on the road is Independence National Historical Park, at Fifth and Market Streets.  Home to the Liberty Bell, Independence Hall, and National Constitution Center, the complex is the heart of Philadelphia's Old City neighborhood.

East of the intersection of Front and Market Streets lies an entrance to Penn's Landing, alongside the Delaware River.

At 2nd Street stands the historic Christ Church, once the tallest building in North America.

Philadelphia television station WTXF-TV 29 (FOX) is situated on Market Street at 4th Street.  A ground-level studio with a window overlooks the street. Also located at the same intersection is Audacy property 94 WIP.

Adjacent to Independence Mall is the National Museum of American Jewish History, which relocated to that location in 2010 and occupies the spot once held by CBS 3 and KYW Newsradio 1060.

The Fashion District Philadelphia shopping mall is located on Market Street between 9th and 12th Streets.  Adjacent is the Pennsylvania Convention Center.

Reading Terminal, the former grand railroad station for the Reading Railroad is located on the northeastern corner of 12th and Market Streets. It now serves as the grand entrance to the Pennsylvania Convention Center.

The PSFS Building, generally regarded as the first International Style building in the US, stands at the intersection with 12th Street.

Philadelphia City Hall stands atop Market Street's intersection with Broad Street. Commuters can access the Market–Frankford Line, Broad Street Line, Subway Surface Lines, and Suburban Station through the 15th Street Headhouse (among other access points) across from City Hall.

One Liberty Place, formerly Philadelphia's tallest building, is located at the southeast corner of 17th and Market Streets. (It was surpassed in height by the Comcast Center, located a block to the north, in June 2007).

30th Street Station, a major train station serving Amtrak intercity trains and SEPTA Regional Rail and NJ Transit commuter trains, is located at the intersection of 30th and Market Streets.

In the University City section of Philadelphia, Market Street crosses through the campuses of Drexel University and University City Science Center. As a result, the section of Market Street along University City is also signed "Avenue of Technology".

In popular culture

 The lyrics to the Bing Crosby song "Down the Old Ox Road" include reference to "Market Street in Philly"
 Market Street and the neon sign at Penn's Landing are featured in the opening titles of the television show It's Always Sunny in Philadelphia.
 The ZOX song "The Wait, Part II" includes the lyric, "They took down all the yellow lights at Market Street and 4th."

Other names
 Market East from Juniper Street at the west to 6th Street (Independence Mall West) at the east.  The Market East area has served as one of Philadelphia's retail hubs since at least the early 19th century, when groups of merchants, farmers, and fishermen set up shops and stalls along Market Street, then known as High Street, west of the Independence Hall area.
 Market West from 15th Street to 30th Street.  This area plays host commercial office space, with numerous skyscrapers, including One Liberty Place, Commerce Square, 2000 Market Street, and the BNY Mellon Center.
 Avenue of Technology (from 34th Street to 38th Street). This section of Market Street was distinguished by "turquoise-and-black lightpost banners."  The area is home to many technology-related institutions.
 Pennsylvania Route 3 from the Philadelphia City Hall at 15th Street to 38th Street

Gallery

References

External links

Market Street, from Front Street from 1840 by John Caspar Wild via the World Digital Library
The High Street Market from The City of Philadelphia, in the State of Pennsylvania North America: as it appeared in the Year 1800 consisting of Twenty Eight Plates, by William Russell Birch and Thomas Birch, 1800.

Lincoln Highway
Culture of Philadelphia
Economy of Philadelphia
Streets in Philadelphia